Farrukh Dustov and Bertram Steinberger were the defending champions, but decided not to participate.
Thiemo de Bakker and Antal van der Duim won the title, defeating Matwé Middelkoop and Igor Sijsling 6–4, 6–7(4–7), [10–6] in the final.

Seeds

Draw

Draw

References
 Main Draw

TEAN International - Doubles
TEAN International